CDK5 regulatory subunit-associated protein 1 is a protein that in humans is encoded by the CDK5RAP1 gene.

Neuronal CDC2-like kinase, which is involved in the regulation of neuronal differentiation, is composed of a catalytic subunit, CDK5, and an activating subunit, p25NCK5A. The protein encoded by this gene binds to p25NCK5A and therefore may be involved in neuronal differentiation. Multiple transcript variants exist for this gene, but the full-length natures of only two have been determined.

References

External links

Further reading